An SSN is a nuclear-powered general-purpose attack submarine. SSN is the US Navy hull classification symbol for such vessels; the SS denotes a submarine and the N denotes nuclear power. The designation SSN is used for interoperability throughout NATO under STANAG 1166, though navies use other terms.

History
The first nuclear-powered attack submarine was the US Navy's , operational from 1954. This was followed by the four submarines of the  entering service in 1957. 
The first all-British nuclear submarines were the two s.

The USN submarine fleet has been all-nuclear powered for over two decades. The bulk of the USN's SSN fleet has been the Los Angeles-class attack submarine. Designed during the Cold War the Los Angeles-class boats raison d'etre was to protect USN carrier battle groups and to hunt Soviet Navy SSBNs before they could launch a first strike against the United States.

The first ever major combat action involving an SSN was during the 1982 Falklands War. An Argentinian cruiser,  was sunk by torpedoes fired by the Royal Navy fleet submarine . After that incident, the Argentinian Navy was effectively confined to port.

Since the end of the Cold War, SSNs have evolved into multi-mission submarines. Their roles include submarine-launched cruise missile platforms, intelligence gathering platforms, insertion and exfiltration of special forces teams in addition to traditional hunter-killer SSN roles.

The advantages of an SSN over a conventionally powered SSK are much longer endurance (limited more by the crew than the boat, a nuclear submarine can stay submerged for months and does not need refueling in their 25-year lifespans), and higher speed. Unlike most SSKs, SSNs do not have to surface periodically for air, which would compromise their stealth. Some of the newest conventional submarines approach these advantages: Stirling engine powered vessels can cruise underwater for up to two weeks and, like diesel/electric vessels (and in theory LOX powered vessels), are significantly quieter than nuclear submarines, since they do not need to run the powerful (and noisy) pumps associated with the cooling circuits of pressurized water reactors.

The main disadvantages of an SSN are the technological challenges and expenses of building and maintaining a nuclear power plant. Nuclear submarines can have political downsides, as some countries refuse to accept nuclear-powered vessels as a matter of policy. Furthermore, decommissioned nuclear submarines require costly dismantling and long term storage of the radioactive waste.

The following navies currently operate SSNs:
 People's Liberation Army Navy of China
 French Navy
 Indian Navy
 Russian Navy
 Royal Navy of the United Kingdom
 United States Navy

Active and future SSN classes

 Royal Australian Navy
 Virginia-class submarine – three planned (with an option to purchase a further two vessels)
 SSN-AUKUS – up to eight planned

 Brazilian Navy
Riachuelo-class submarine – one under construction

 People's Liberation Army Navy of the People's Republic of China

Han-class submarine (Type 091) – three in service, two retired
Type 093 submarine – six in service
Type 095 submarine – five planned 

 French Navy
 – five in service, one retired
Barracuda-class submarine – one in service, six planned

 Indian Navy
 – one to be delivered by 2025. (Another leased Akula class submarine was returned to Russia in 2021, before the end of its contract. ) 
Project 75 Alpha – six planned 
 
 Russian Navy
Victor III-class submarine – three in service, 45 retired 
Sierra II-class submarine – two in service
 – 10 in service, four retired
Yasen-class submarine – one in service, 12 planned

 Royal Navy of the United Kingdom
(Known as "fleet submarines" in the Royal Navy.)

 – three in service, four retired
 –  five in service, seven planned
SSN-AUKUS – number unknown (first design contract awarded)

 United States Navy

 – 30 in service, 32 retired
 – three in service
 – 19 in service, 48 planned in total

Retired SSN classes
 Indian Navy
INS Chakra - leased Soviet Charlie-class submarine commissioned between 1987 – 1991.

 Royal Navy of the United Kingdom
  - the Royal Navy's first nuclear-powered fleet submarine 1963 - 1980
  - 2 submarines in service 1966 - 1994
   - 3 submarines in service 1970 - 1992
  - 6 submarines 1973-2010

 Soviet /  Russian Navy
 November-class submarine 1958-1991
 K-278 Komsomolets  - only member of the "Mike" class, 1984 - 1989 (sank after fire)
 Alfa-class submarine

 United States Navy
  (unique)
  (unique)
  - 4 submarines in service 1957 - 1989
  - 6 submarines in service 1959 - 1990 (One lost, 1968)
 USS Triton (SSN-586) (unique)
 USS Halibut (SSN-587) (unique)
  - 14 submarines in service 1961 - 1996 (One lost, 1963)
  (unique)
  - 37 submarines in service 1967 - 2004
  (unique)
  (unique)

See also
 Nuclear submarine
 Ballistic missile submarine (SSB/SSBN)
 Cruise missile submarine (SSG/SSGN)
 List of submarine classes
 List of submarine classes of the Royal Navy
 List of Soviet and Russian submarine classes
 List of submarine classes of the United States Navy

References

Attack submarines